Donald Rutherford (born 1942) is a British economist and Lecturer in Economics at the University of Edinburgh. He was educated at The Queen's College, Oxford and was Lecturer (1969-2009) and subsequently honorary lecturer at the College. 
Rutherford is known for his writings on the history of economic thought and Scottish economics.

Books
 Suspicions of Markets: Critical Attacks from Aristotle to the Twenty-First Century (2016). Palgrave Macmillan
 Maynard's World (2014)
 Routledge Dictionary of Economics, 3rd edition (2012). Routledge
 In the Shadow of Adam Smith (2012). Palgrave Macmillan
    
 Collected Works of Nassau William Senior (ed.) (1998)

References

External links 
 

British economists
Living people
1942 births
Academics of the University of Edinburgh
Alumni of the University of Oxford